Uzyan (Üźän) is a rural locality (a selo) and the administrative centre of Uzyansky Selsoviet, Beloretsky District, Bashkortostan, Russia. The population was 1,140 as of 2010. There are 23 streets.

Geography 
Uzyan is located 53 km southwest of Beloretsk (the district's administrative centre) by road. Kagarmanovo is the nearest rural locality.

References 

Rural localities in Beloretsky District